The 2011 Pan Arab Games also known as the 12th Pan Arab Games took place in Doha, Qatar from 6 to 23 December 2011. This was the first time that the country had hosted the multi-sport event. Khalifa International Stadium was the main venue for the competition.

Preparation

Host selection
Qatar was awarded rights to organise the games beating Lebanon in the bidding process. Arab Federation for Sports secretary-general Othman Al-Saad said that Qatar's hosting of the Pan-Arab Games would give the event "more momentum and significance in light of the huge capabilities and world-class sports facilities which Qatar owns."

Khalifa International Stadium was chosen to be the focal point of the games, hosting the opening ceremonies, while the closing ceremonies were held on Jassim Bin Hamad Stadium.

Transport
Public Transport for the event was provided by Mowasalat in the form of Buses, Taxis and Limousines. The opening and closing ceremonies were allocated 100 buses for the respective days. There were on average approximately 230 buses dedicated to the games to transport Athletes, Games Staff, Coaching Staff, Media, and Sports Officials to and from The Airport, Hotels, Athlete's Village, Sports Venues, Practice Venues, and the Media Centre. The services were planned & scheduled by Mowasalat’s Mass Transit Planning Manager Mr Sheldon Cowie who also managed the event transport operationally with TMS (Transport Management Services)

Mascot and medals
Wathnan, a graceful yet fun-spirited white Arabian horse was designed as the mascot for the Games. An important animal in Arabian culture, the horse is a symbol of great strength and agility. Pearl and emerald studded Bronze, Silver, and Gold medals were awarded to winning athletes, accompanied by mascot stuffed toy. The medals were measured 70 mm in diameter and 6 mm in thickness with base made out of pewter.

Venues

Sports

Demonstration sports

Participating National Olympic Committees
Initially, all twenty-two nations of the Union of Arab National Olympic Committees were scheduled to compete at the games. However, Syria withdrew its team in November 2011 in protest of the Arab League's suspension of the country's membership.

  (223)
  (171)
  (21)
  (38)
  (349)
  (436) (Top Nation)
  (240)
  (260)
  (99)
  (148)
  (43)
  (253)
  (94)
  (109)
  (370) (Host)
  (232)
  (22)
  (191)
  (withdrew)
  (218)
  (144)
  (46)

Medal table

Paralympic Medal Standings
Medals in 30 Para Athletics and 1 Goalball events were awarded to athletes from respective participating nations. However, as demonstration events, they were not counted into the official medal table.

See also
 2006 Asian Games
 2019 World Beach Games
 2022 FIFA World Cup

References

External links
 Official website
 Official Results website
 Opening ceremony video

 
2011 in multi-sport events
2011
2011 in Qatari sport
Pan Arab Games, 2011
Multi-sport events in Qatar
21st century in Doha
December 2011 sports events in Asia